The clergy–penitent privilege, clergy privilege, confessional privilege, priest–penitent privilege, pastor–penitent privilege, clergyman–communicant privilege, or ecclesiastical privilege, is a rule of evidence that forbids judicial inquiry into certain communications (spoken or otherwise) between clergy and members of their congregation. This rule recognises certain communication as privileged and not subject to otherwise obligatory disclosure; for example, this often applies to communications between lawyers and clients. In many jurisdictions certain communications between a member of the clergy of some or all religious faiths (e.g., a minister, priest, rabbi, imam) and a person consulting them in confidence are privileged in law. In particular, Catholics, Lutherans and Anglicans, among adherents of other Christian denominations, confess their sins to priests, who are unconditionally forbidden by Church canon law from making any disclosure, a position supported by the law of many countries, although in conflict with civil (secular) law in some jurisdictions. It is a distinct concept from that of confidentiality (see non-disclosure agreement).

The protection of the clergy–penitent privilege relationships rests on one of the more basic privileges as strong or stronger than the similar clauses to confidentiality between lawyer and client.

Australia

In the state of Queensland, a law was passed on August 9, 2020, that forces members of the clergy to report known or suspected cases of abuse to the police, meaning they are no longer allowed to use the sanctity of the confessional as a defence or excuse in child sex abuse matters.

Canada
Two Canadian provinces recognize the privilege in the communications between individuals and their religious leaders in their statutes (Newfoundland under its Evidence Act  and Quebec under its  Charter of Human Rights and Freedoms). Otherwise, religious communication is covered by common law.

Canadian law descends from British common law, and as such the status of priest–penitent privilege is not well defined in national jurisprudence. R. v. Gruenke from 1991 is the leading Supreme Court of Canada case regarding this privilege. Religious communications are not presumptively (prima facie) privileged.

The court establishes that a test, proposed by John Henry Wigmore, might be employed to determine whether a specific communication is privileged or not. The "Wigmore Criteria" are seen as a general framework, not a "carved in stone" approach. The "Wigmore Criteria" are generally used to determine if privilege covers communications that do not fall under the classic privileged communications such as solicitor–client privilege or spousal privilege.

To determine whether a communication is privileged, the "Wigmore Criteria" state that:
The communications must originate in a confidence that they will not be disclosed.
This element of confidentiality must be essential to the full and satisfactory maintenance of the relation between the parties.
The relation must be one which in the opinion of the community ought to be sedulously fostered.
The injury that would inure to the relation by the disclosure of the communication must be greater than the benefit thereby gained for the correct disposal of litigation.

The "Wigmore Criteria" are informed by the Canadian Charter of Rights and Freedoms guarantee of freedom of religion (protected under s.2(a)) and the interpretive s.27 ("This Charter shall be interpreted in a manner consistent with the preservation and enhancement of the multicultural heritage of Canadians.")

As a result of s.27, the term "religious communications" is used in place of the more common "priest–penitent" term. Similarly, analysis should begin from a non-denominational approach.

Religious freedom strengthens the argument in favour of recognition of the privilege for religious communications. However, religious communications are only privileged in particular cases when the Wigmore criteria are satisfied. While a formal confession process is not necessary, it can help in determining whether there is an expectation of privacy when evaluating the communication using the "Wigmore Criteria."

In R. v. Gruenke, it was found that the communications were not privileged because there was no expectation of privilege between Ms. Gruenke and her pastor and her religious counsellor.

In October 1999, it was reported that the Canadian government had opposed a plan to recognize the value of priest–penitient privilege within the bounds of international law.

France 

In October 2021, a report which investigated sexual abuse of children by Catholic clergy and lay persons employed by the church, recommended to require priests to notify the police about child abuse cases that are mentioned in confession. Bishop Eric de Moulins-Beaufort rejected the recommendation. Interior minister Darmanin told him in a meeting that priests are obliged to report cases of sexual violence against children, even when heard in the confessional, to the police. The spokesperson for the French bishops' conference later said that they are not required to do that.

Germany 

The  found that the privilege was used to cover up sexual abuse.

Ireland 
The privilege was recognised under the common law of the Republic of Ireland as the privilege of the priest in the case of Cook v. Carroll [1945] IR 515., reversing an earlier judgment from 1802. In 2011, in the wake of several sex abuse scandals, the Fine Gael–Labour government announced plans to criminalise failure to report an allegation of child abuse, even if made during confession. Seán Brady, the Catholic primate of all Ireland, condemned this as compromising the seal of the confessional.

Poland 
Article 178 of the Polish Code of Criminal Procedure explicitly forbids calling a clergyman as a witness in order to disclose information he obtained during a confession. Article 261 of the Polish Code of Civil Procedure allows clergymen to abstain from testifying if this would reveal information he obtained during a confession.

United Kingdom

The status of priest–penitent privilege in English law has not been absolutely determined (see specific articles).

United States

According to former Chief Justice of the United States Warren Burger, "The clergy privilege is rooted in the imperative need for confidence and trust. The... privilege recognizes the human need to disclose to a spiritual counselor, in total and absolute confidence, what are believed to be flawed acts or thoughts and to receive consolations and guidance in return."

A pastor has a duty to hold in confidence any information obtained during a counseling session. A pastor who violates this trust might be on the losing end of a suit for an invasion of privacy or defamation.

The First Amendment is largely cited as the jurisprudential basis. The earliest and most influential case acknowledging the priest–penitent privilege was People v. Phillips (1813), where the Court of General Sessions of the City of New York refused to compel a priest to testify. The Court opined:

A few years after Phillips was decided, People v. Smith distinguished the case on the grounds that the defendant had approached the minister as a "friend or adviser," not in his capacity as a professional or spiritual advisor. As with most privileges, a debate still exists about the circumstances under which the priest–penitent privilege applies. The capacity in which the clergyman is acting at the time of the communication is relevant in many jurisdictions.

Clergy–penitent privilege and mandated reporting 
In U.S. practice, the confidentiality privilege has been extended to non-Catholic clergy and non-sacramental counseling, with explicit clergy exemptions put into most state law over the past several decades. In most states, information gained within a confession or private conversation is considered privileged and may be exempted from mandatory reporting requirements.

Federal rule
Proposed, but rejected, Rule 506 (Communications to Clergy) of the Federal Rules of Evidence provides:

Legal precedents in various states 
According to New York state law, confessions and confidences made to a clergyman or other minister are privileged and cannot be used as evidence. This privilege is not limited to communications with a particular kind of priest or congregant, and it is not confined to statements made "under the cloak of confession". What matters is that the conversations were of a spiritual nature, and were confidential enough to indicate that the penitent intended that they be kept secret and that the penitent did not waive the privilege subsequently.

New York law (NY CPLR 4505) provides that unless the person confessing or confiding waives the privilege, a clergyman, or other ministers of any religion or duly accredited Christian Science practitioner, shall not be allowed to disclose a confession or confidence made to him in his professional character as a spiritual advisor.

A 1999 Oregon bill gives clergy members the same type of immunity long granted to spouses, whose conversations are privileged.

Oregon Statute ORS 40.260 (Clergy–Penitent Privilege) states confidential communication made privately and not intended for further disclosure may not be examined unless consent to the disclosure of the confidential communication is given by the person who made the communication. Oregon's reporting law 419B.010(1), explicitly exempts pastors from any duty to report such privileged communications.

In California, absent waivers, Cal. Evid. Code § 912, both clergy and penitent – whether or not parties to the action – have the privilege to refuse to disclose a "penitential" communication. Cal. Evid. Code §§ 1033-34.

In twenty-five states, the clergyman–communicant statutory privilege does not clearly indicate who holds the privilege. In seventeen states, the penitent's right to hold the privilege is clearly stated. In only six states, both a penitent and a member of the clergy are expressly allowed by the statute to hold the privilege.

In Florida, pastors have an absolute right to keep counseling details confidential.

The Official Code of Georgia Annotated states: Every communication made by any person professing religious faith, seeking spiritual comfort, or seeking counseling to any Protestant minister of the Gospel, any priest of the Roman Catholic faith, any priest of the Greek Orthodox Catholic faith, any Jewish rabbi, or any Christian or Jewish minister or similar functionary, by whatever name called, shall be deemed privileged. No such minister, priest, rabbi, or similar functionary shall disclose any communications made to him or her by any such person professing religious faith, seeking spiritual guidance, or seeking counseling, nor shall such minister, priest, rabbi, or similar functionary be competent or compellable to testify with reference to any such communication in any court (O.C.G.A 24-5-502).

Louisiana's Supreme Court ruled in 2014 that a priest may be compelled to testify about what he was told in the confessional regarding a particular sexual abuse case, leaving the priest at risk of excommunication if he even confirms that a confession took place, or jail for contempt of court should he refuse to testify. However, the Court later ruled that a priest has no duty to report confidential information heard during a sacramental confession.

Justification of the principle
McNicol gives three arguments in favour of the privilege:
Freedom of religion.
The ethical duty of ministers of religion to keep confessions confidential.
The practical fact that ministers of religion will inevitably be ruled by the conscience and defy the courts, even at the cost of their own liberty.

Jeremy Bentham, writing in the early years of the nineteenth century, devoted a whole chapter to serious, considered argument that Roman Catholic confession should be exempted from disclosure in judicial proceedings, even in Protestant countries, entitled: Exclusion of the Evidence of a Catholic Priest, respecting the confessions entrusted to him, proper.

See also
Privilege (evidence)
Duty of confidentiality
Admissible evidence

References

Bibliography

, Ch.5

External links
Privileged and Confidential Communications by Richard R. Hammar

 
Privileged communication

de:Beichtgeheimnis